Sugaryn Gan-Erdene (born 12 March 2003), is a Mongolian chess player. He is an International master since 2019. He is ranked 8th player and best U18 player in Mongolia. He is ranked 16th U18 player in Asia.

Career

Gan-Erdene played in the U-10 section of the 2013 World Youth Chess Championship, finishing on 7.5 points out of 11.

He played in the Chess World Cup 2019, where he was defeated by Ian Nepomniachtchi in the first round.

References

External links

Sugar Gan-Erdene chess games at 365Chess.com

2003 births
Living people
Mongolian chess players
21st-century Mongolian people